Keralapura is a village in Hassan district of Karnataka state, India.

Location
Keralapura village is located between Saligrama and Ramanathapura towns of Karnataka state in India. The nearest town is Arkalgud  at a distance of 30 km.

Post office
There is a post office in Keralapura village and the postal code is 573136.

Economy
The village economy is mostly agrarian.  There is a branch of Canara Bank in Keralapura. Keralapura people are clever in running restaurants all over Karnataka. Their outlets are called 'Keralapura Hindu Military Hotels'. 'Military' means non-vegetarian food is served. 'Hindu' means only chicken and lamb are served and beef is not cooked.

Landmarks
 Sri.Veerabhadreshwara Temple
sri srinivasa anjaneya swamy temple
 Shree Hampe Viroopaaksheshwara Swaamy
 Shree Renuka Yallamma Devi Temple
 Shree Hole Saalamma Devi Temple
 Basavana Gudi, Keralapura
 kaveri river

Villages and suburbs
 Rudrapatna, 6 km
 Yalagathavalli, 14 km
 Kattepura, 14 km
 Konanur, 14 km
 Dodda Magge, 15 km
 Bidarakka, 7 km
 Rudrapatna, 7 km
 Basavapatna, 8 km
 Lakkkur, 8 km
 Niduvani, 11 km
 Honnenahalli 2 km

Demographics
The total population of the village is 4,311. There are 969 houses in the village and the village area is 397 hectares.

Educational organizations
 Saibaba School
 Dr.SRK School
 Kengal School
 Government Primary School

See also
 Saligrama, Mysore
 Hole Narasipur
 Mangalore
 Arkalgud

References

Villages in Hassan district